Jong Kwang-sok (born 5 January 1994) is a North Korean footballer. He represented North Korea on at least one occasion in 2014.

Career statistics

International

References

External links

1994 births
Living people
Sportspeople from Pyongyang
North Korean footballers
North Korea youth international footballers
North Korea international footballers
Association football defenders